Thathamangalam Damodaran Ramakrishnan (born 1961) is an Indian novelist, translator, and retired Chief Controller in Southern Railway. He has authored two best-selling Malayalam novels: Francis Itty Cora and Sugandhi Enna Andal Devanayaki. He is a recipient of the Kerala Sahitya Akademi Award and Vayalar Award.

Early life
He was born at Eyyal village in Thrissur, India in 1961 to a Brahmin family as the son of Damodaran Elayathu and Sreedevi Antarjanam. He completed his schooling from Kunnamkulam Boys High School and Erumappetty Government High School, and his pre-degree and degree from UC College, Aluva. In 1981, he joined Indian Railways as a ticket collector in Salem. He worked in Calicut for one and a half years from 1982. In 1983, he worked as a ticket examiner in Madras and Salem. He moved to Palghat in 1985. From 1995 onwards, he became a controller in the Palghat Railway Divisional Office. He served as Southern Railway Chief Controller from January 2006 to 31 January 2016. On 31 January 2016, he retired from service in order to be active in literature.

Literary career
His first novel Alpha is set in an imaginative island called Alpha which is located somewhere near Sri Lanka and narrates the story of an experiment on human brain undertaken by an anthropologist. His second novel, Francis Itty Cora, received considerable acclaims from critics for its unprecedented incorporation of many global historical characters and knowledge available to the present Malayalam readers for weaving the story line. The novel deals with the exploration of a merchant named Francis Itty Cora, hailing from the Kerala of 15th century. His third novel, Sugandhi Enna Andal Devanayaki, is based on the death of Tamil human rights activist Rajini Thiranagama who was allegedly shot dead by Tamil Tigers cadres after she criticised them for their atrocities.

Ramakrishnan, who had lived in Tamil Nadu for the most part of his career, is also deeply associated with Tamil literature. He introduced several Tamil literary works to Keralites and has won the E. K. Divakaran Potti Award for Best Translator in 2007.

Personal life
He is married to Anandavalli and has two children: Vishnu and Surya .

List of works
 Alpha (Novel)
 Francis Itty Cora (Novel)
 Sugandhi Enna Andal Devanayaki (Novel)
 Hmm (Translation of the Tamil novel Hmm by Shobasakthi)
 Thappu Thalangal (Translation of the Tamil book Thappu Thalangal by Charu Nivedita
 Mama Africa (Novel)
 Andhar Badirar Mookar (Novel)
 Pacha Manja Chuvappu (Novel)

Awards
 2016: Kerala Sahitya Akademi Award for Novel – Sugandhi Enna Andal Devanayaki
 2016: Malayattoor Award  – Sugandhi Enna Andal Devanayaki
 2016: Abu Dhabi Sakthi Award for Novel – Sugandhi Enna Andal Devanayaki
 2017: Vayalar Award – Sugandhi Enna Andal Devanayaki

References

1961 births
Living people
Novelists from Kerala
Malayali people
People from Thrissur district
People from Palakkad district
Writers from Thrissur
Writers from Palakkad
Indian male novelists
Malayalam-language writers
Malayalam novelists
Recipients of the Kerala Sahitya Akademi Award
20th-century Indian novelists
21st-century Indian novelists
20th-century Indian male writers
21st-century Indian male writers
20th-century translators
21st-century translators
20th-century Indian translators
21st-century Indian translators
Translators to Malayalam
Tamil–Malayalam translators
Recipients of the Abu Dhabi Sakthi Award